The 2007 Rose Bowl Game presented by Citi was a college football bowl game played on January 1, 2007 at the Rose Bowl in Pasadena, California.  It was the 93rd Rose Bowl Game and part of the 2006–2007 Bowl Championship Series (BCS) at the conclusion of the 2006 NCAA Division I FBS football season.  In the game, the University of Southern California Trojans, champions of the Pacific-10 Conference, defeated the University of Michigan Wolverines, second-place finishers in the Big Ten Conference, 32–18. USC wide receiver Dwayne Jarrett and USC outside linebacker Brian Cushing were named the Rose Bowl Players of the Game.

Historically, the Rose Bowl has pitted the champions the Big Ten and Pac-10.  What made the 2007 Rose Bowl a not-so-traditional matchup is that Michigan entered as the runner-up of the Big Ten.  The Big Ten champions, Ohio State, were ranked #1 and instead participated in the 2007 BCS National Championship Game.  Michigan won their first 11 games in 2006, but lost their last regular season game to the undefeated Buckeyes in Columbus, 42–39.

Pre-game
A moment of silence prior to the national anthem was held in memory of former Michigan center, 38th President of the United States, and 1978 Tournament of Roses Grand Marshal Gerald Ford, who died six days earlier. George Lucas, Southern California alum, the creator of the Star Wars series of films, and 2007 Tournament of Roses Grand Marshal, flipped the coin. The coin used featured Southern California's logo on one on side and Michigan's logo on the other. Neither team called a side as the team's logo that landed up won the coin toss. Southern California deferred after winning the coin toss, and Michigan elected to receive the ball on the kickoff. The game officially started at 2:00 pm PST (UTC−8).

Scoring summary

Game notes
Many times the participants of the Rose Bowl game have been the winners of the respective UCLA–USC rivalry and Michigan-Ohio State rivalry games, although there have been instances where the loser of the rivalry game still won the conference championship. In the 2007 Rose Bowl game, the participants both were the losers of those games, and Michigan was an at-large BCS participant with a second place Big Ten finish.

References

External links
 Summary at Bentley Historical Library, University of Michigan Athletics History
 ESPN game summary

Rose Bowl
Rose Bowl Game
Michigan Wolverines football bowl games
USC Trojans football bowl games
January 2007 sports events in the United States
Rose
21st century in Pasadena, California